George Edward Holloway III known as Bud Holloway (born March 1, 1988) is a Canadian former professional ice hockey right wing. He was selected by the Los Angeles Kings in the 3rd round (86th overall) of the 2006 NHL Entry Draft.

Playing career
Holloway played for the Seattle Thunderbirds of the Western Hockey League from 2004 to 2008. He then split the 2008–09 campaign between AHL's Manchester Monarchs and ECHL's Ontario Reign. After two more years with the Monarchs, he took his game to Sweden. On July 25, 2011, Holloway was signed as a free agent by Skellefteå AIK of the Swedish Hockey League (SHL). He was acquired by Skellefteå around the same time as fellow Manchester Monarchs' player Oscar Möller. Holloway won the Swedish National Championship with Skellefteå AIK in 2013 and 2014, and received the Golden Helmet Award as the league's Player of the Year following the 2012–13 season.

In the SHL playoffs, Holloway holds the record for the most points in a single playoff year (23 points: 10 G, 13 A), which he set in the 2011–12 season, surpassing Espen Knutsen's 21 points in the 1999–2000 season. The following season, Holloway became only the second player in SHL history (after Håkan Loob in 1982–83) to score over 70 points in a single SHL regular season; he scored 20 goals and 51 assists for a total of 71 points.

On May 17, 2014, Holloway left the SHL after three seasons and signed as a free agent to a two-year contract with Swiss club SC Bern of the NLA. He won the Swiss cup competition with SCB. He saw the ice in 53 NLA contests, tallying 17 goals and 28 assists. Holloway parted company with SC Bern following the 2014–15 season.

On July 1, 2015, Holloway signed a one-year, two-way contract with the Montreal Canadiens for the 2015–16 season. On November 27, 2015, Holloway made his NHL debut, and his only NHL appearance to date, in a game against the New Jersey Devils. He spent most of the season with Montreal's AHL affiliate, the St. John's IceCaps. Holloway played a further three seasons with Skellefteå AIK before leaving following the conclusion of the 2018–19 season. On June 6, 2019, Holloway signed as a free agent to a one-year contract with Austrian outfit EC Red Bull Salzburg of the EBEL.

Career statistics

Regular season and playoffs

International

References

External links
 

1988 births
Living people
SC Bern players
Canadian ice hockey left wingers
HC CSKA Moscow players
Los Angeles Kings draft picks
Manchester Monarchs (AHL) players
Montreal Canadiens players
Ontario Reign (ECHL) players
EC Red Bull Salzburg players
St. John's IceCaps players
Seattle Thunderbirds players
Skellefteå AIK players
Canadian expatriate ice hockey players in Russia
Canadian expatriate ice hockey players in Switzerland
Canadian expatriate ice hockey players in Sweden